Romeo is the male protagonist in the play Romeo and Juliet.

Romeo may also refer to:

People and fictional characters
 Romeo (given name), including a list of people and fictional characters
 Romeo (surname), a list of people
 nickname of Aditya Dev (1988–2012), Indian body builder, entertainer and dancer and the "world's smallest bodybuilder"
 Kid Romeo, American professional wrestler
 A term for a man who wants sexual relationships with many women

Places

United States
 Romeo, Colorado, a statutory town
 Romeo, Florida, an unincorporated community
 Romeo, Michigan, a village
 Romeo, Tennessee, an unincorporated community

Antarctica
 Romeo Island

Outer space
 Romeo (lunar crater), a lunar crater
 Romeo (crater on Oberon), a crater on Oberon

Music
 Romeo Records, an American jazz record label
 Romeo (English rapper) (born 1980), English rapper and MC
Romeo, stage name of Romeo Miller, an American rapper and actor
 Romeo (band), a South Korean boy band
 Romeo (EP), a 2009 EP by Shinee

Songs
 "Romeo" (Basement Jaxx song), 2001
 "Romeo" (Dino song), 1990
 "Romeo" (Dolly Parton song), 1993
 "Romeo" (Ketil Stokkan song), 1986
 "Romeo" (Petula Clark song), 1961
 "Romeo" (Wipers song), 1981
 "Romeo", by Donna Summer from I'm a Rainbow
 "Romeo", by Hande Yene, from Nasıl Delirdim?
 "Romeo", by Jungle featuring Bas, 2021
 "Romeo", by Mr Big
 "Romeo", by Sublime from Second-hand Smoke
 "Romeo", by Bladee from Eversince

Film and television
 Romeo (1976 film), a Malayalam film
 Romeo (1990 film), a Dutch drama
 Romeo (2007 film), a Malayalam film
 Parugu or Romeo, a 2008 Telugu film
 Romeo (2011 film), a Bengali film
 Romeo (2012 film), a Kannada-language film
 Romeo (2014 film), a Telugu-language film
 Romeo!, a Nickelodeon television series starring Romeo Miller that aired from 2003 to 2006

Military
 Romeo class submarine, the NATO reporting name for a Soviet submarine type
 Operation Romeo, a French World War II commando operation
 Fokker C.V, a Dutch reconnaissance and light bomber biplane manufactured in Italy under licence as the Romeo Ro.1
 USS Romeo, a Union tinclad during the American Civil War

Other uses
 Romeo, the letter R in the ICAO spelling alphabet
 Alfa Romeo Romeo, a light van and pickup truck formerly produced by Alfa Romeo
 Romeo file system, an extension to the ISO 9660 file system for optical media
 RoMEO, Rights MEtadata for Open archiving
 Romeo (wolf) ( 2000–2009), Alaskan wolf notable for interactions with humans
 Romeo State Airport, a public airport near Romeo, Michigan
 The "Romeo" method is a form of victim grooming for the purposes of pimping; see Procuring (prostitution)#Grooming

See also 
 Romeoo, a 2007 Malayalam film directed by Rafi Mecartin
 Roamio, the name of a series of TiVo digital video recorders